

The FFV Aerotech BA-14 Starling is a Swedish two-seat light monoplane designed by Björn Andreasson and developed as a joint venture between Malmo Forsknings & Innovations and FFV Aerotech.

Design and development
The prototype Starling first flew on 25 August 1988, it is a shoulder-wing monoplane mainly built from composite materials. The semi-monocoque fuselage has a V-tail which has a small ventral fin with a tailskid, the main landing gear is a fixed tricycle type. The prototype was powered by a  Lycoming O-235 flat-four piston engine with a two-bladed fixed-pitch tractor propeller. The enclosed cabin has side-by-side configuration seating for two under a one-piece transparent canopy.

A BA-14 appeared at the 1988 SBAC Farnborough Airshow.

Specifications (Utility variant)

References

Notes

Bibliography

1980s Swedish civil utility aircraft
V-tail aircraft
Single-engined tractor aircraft
BA-14
Shoulder-wing aircraft
Aircraft first flown in 1988